Beat the Devil is a 1953 adventure comedy film directed by John Huston. It starred Humphrey Bogart, Jennifer Jones, and Gina Lollobrigida and featured Robert Morley, Peter Lorre, and Bernard Lee.  Huston and Truman Capote wrote the screenplay, loosely based upon the 1951 novel of the same name by British journalist Claud Cockburn writing under the pseudonym James Helvick. Huston made the film as a sort of loose parody of the 1941 film The Maltese Falcon, which Huston directed and in which Bogart and Lorre appeared. Capote said, "John [Huston] and I decided to kid the story, to treat it as a parody. Instead of another Maltese Falcon, we turned it into a... [spoof] on this type of film."

The script, written on a day-to-day basis as the film was shot, concerns the adventures of a motley crew of swindlers and ne'er-do-wells trying to claim land rich in uranium deposits in Kenya as they wait in a small Italian port to travel aboard a tramp steamer en route to Mombasa.

Plot 
Billy Dannreuther is a formerly wealthy American who has fallen on hard times. He is reluctantly working with four crooks: Peterson, Julius O'Hara, Major Jack Ross, and Ravello, who are trying to acquire uranium-rich land in British East Africa. Billy suspects that Major Ross murdered a British Colonial officer who threatened to expose their plan. While waiting in Italy for passage to Africa, Billy and his wife Maria meet a British couple, Harry and Gwendolen Chelm, who plan to travel on the same ship. Harry seems a very proper and traditional Englishman, while Gwendolen is flighty and a compulsive fantasist. Billy and Gwendolen have an affair, while Maria flirts with Harry. Peterson becomes suspicious that the Chelms may be attempting to acquire the uranium themselves. Though this is untrue, it seems confirmed by Gwendolen, who lies about her husband and exaggerates his importance.

Billy and Peterson decide to take a plane instead, but their car runs over a cliff when they are pushing it after a breakdown and the pair are wrongly reported to have been killed. In order to replace Peterson's lost capital, Ravello approaches Harry Chelm and explains their scheme. Just then, to everyone's surprise, Billy and Peterson return to the hotel unharmed, just as the purser announces that the ship is at last ready to sail. On board, Harry reveals that he knows about Peterson's scheme and intends to inform the authorities. Peterson orders Major Ross to kill Harry, but Billy thwarts the murder attempt. Disbelieving Harry's outraged accusations, however, the ship's drunken captain has Harry locked in the brig.

The ship's engine malfunctions and the passengers are told to escape by lifeboat. When Billy goes to rescue Harry, he finds that he has freed himself and left the ship, intending to swim ashore. Having abandoned ship, the passengers land on an African beach, where they are arrested by Arab soldiers. They are interrogated by Ahmed, an Arab official who suspects that they may be spies or revolutionaries. Billy creates a distraction by fleeing the room, and befriends Ahmed when he is recaptured by talking to him about Rita Hayworth, whom he pretends to have known. Billy then persuades him to send the party back to Italy by sailing boat.

After the party land, they are questioned by a Scotland Yard detective who is investigating the murder of the Colonial officer. Just as he seems taken in by Peterson's smooth talk, Gwendolen reveals Peterson's scheme, his involvement in the murder, and his attempt to kill Harry. The detective promptly arrests Peterson, O'Hara, Ross, and Ravello. As the four crooks are led away in handcuffs, Gwendolen receives a telegram from British East Africa saying that Harry has acquired the land where Peterson and the others were aiming to enrich themselves; he is now extremely wealthy and willing to forgive Gwendolen. Billy laughs happily, saying, "This is the end, the end!"

Cast 

 Humphrey Bogart as Billy Dannreuther
 Jennifer Jones as Mrs. Gwendolen Chelm
 Gina Lollobrigida as Maria Dannreuther
 Robert Morley as Peterson
 Peter Lorre as Julius O'Hara
 Edward Underdown as Harry Chelm
 Ivor Barnard as Major Jack Ross
 Marco Tulli as Ravello
 Manuel Serrano as Ahmed
 Bernard Lee as Inspector Jack Clayton
 Mario Perrone as Purser on SS Nyanga
 Giulio Donnini as Administrator
 Saro Urzì as Captain of SS Nyanga
 Juan de Landa as Hispano-Suiza Driver
 Aldo Silvani as Charles, restaurant owner
 Alex Pochet as Hotel Manager (uncredited)
 Mimo Poli as Barman (uncredited)

Production
During the filming of Beat the Devil, Humphrey Bogart lost several of his teeth in a car accident. Peter Sellers, then not known internationally but with a talent for imitating voices, was hired to dub some of Bogart's lines while Bogart was adjusting to the loss of his teeth and unable to speak clearly.

Much of the film was shot at Ravello, above Italy's Amalfi Coast. The central piazza in front of the cathedral and various cafes around it are shown. Some scenes were also shot in nearby Atrani, including - briefly - the pool area of the Hotel Convento Luna.

Release and reception 
Following previews, four minutes was cut from the film and it was re-edited with a voice-over narration by Bogart and a flashback structure.

In a review coinciding with the film's release to 68 New York metropolitan area cinemas, The New York Times called it a "pointedly roguish and conversational spoof, generally missing the book's bite, bounce and decidedly snug construction."

Humphrey Bogart reportedly disliked the film, possibly because he lost a good deal of his own money financing it. Roger Ebert, who included the film in his "Great Movies" list, observed that the film has been characterized as the first camp film. Beat the Devil has been in the public domain for many years, its copyright having never been renewed.

2016 restoration 
In August 2016, an uncut version of Beat the Devil premiered at The Reel Thing Technical Symposium. The 4K restoration was done by Sony Pictures in collaboration with The Film Foundation and overseen by Grover Crisp. Five major differences between the two versions of the film were reported by Gary Teetzel for the website DVD Savant. Four minutes were restored, as compared to the original version, bringing the total running length of the film to 93 or 94 minutes. Unlike the original version, this restoration is copyrighted by Sony subsidiary Columbia Pictures.

References

Bibliography
 Plimpton, George (1997). Truman Capote: In Which Various Friends, Enemies, Acquaintances and Detractors Recall His Turbulent Career. New York, Nan A. Talese (an imprint of Doubleday). .

External links 
 
 
 
 
 
 

1953 films
1950s adventure comedy films
British black-and-white films
British adventure comedy films
British parody films
Films based on British novels
Films directed by John Huston
Films set in Italy
Films with screenplays by John Huston
Films with screenplays by Truman Capote
1950s parody films
Films shot in Italy
Ravello
Articles containing video clips
1953 comedy films
1950s English-language films
Treasure hunt films
1950s British films